Queen Elizabeth High School  is a high school with academy status situated in Herefordshire, on the outskirts of Bromyard. The school meets the educational needs of the children in the area, with feeder primary schools including Burley Gate Primary School, St Peters Primary School, Brockhamton Primary School, Bredenbury Primary School and Pencombe C of E Primary School . The governing board recently changed the name back to Queen Elizabeth High School from Queen Elizabeth Humanities College.

History 
Education in Bromyard can be traced back to 1394 when a chantry school was founded. After the dissolution of the chantries, the school was granted a charter for its re-foundation as a Boy's Grammar School by Queen Elizabeth I of England in 1566.

In 1958, the Grammar School, which had been admitting boys and girls from the beginning of this century, combined with the secondary school established in 1961 to open the school as Bromyard County Secondary School in 1963.

In 1976, Sixth Form education was concentrated at Hereford Sixth Form College and this school became a comprehensive school catering for pupils aged 11 to 16.

Since 2007, the college has progressed notably, producing high GCSE results. A school inspection in 2011 found that "Teachers, support staff and governors all share a strong sense of moral purpose that their students deserve the best possible education, and this leads to the current culture of continuous improvement and 96% of parents surveyed stated that they were happy with their child's experience of this school"  On 1 December 2011, the school officially gained academy status.

A former pupil of the school was Robin Chater, Secretary-General of the Federation of International Employers

References

External links 
 School Home Page
 Old Historic Photos from the School
 OFSTED reports
 Get The Data
 GCSE info
 Term Time Dates 2018/19.

Educational institutions established in 1961
Academies in Herefordshire
1961 establishments in England
Secondary schools in Herefordshire
Bromyard